Mountain View Hospital can be one of the following:

 Mountain View Hospital (Gadsden, Alabama)
 Mountain View Hospital (Idaho Falls, Idaho) 
 Mountain View Hospital, Las Vegas Nevada
 Mountain View Hospital (Las Cruces, New Mexico)
 Mountain View Hospital in Madras, Oregon, now St. Charles Medical Center - Madras
 Mountain View Hospital (Payson, Utah) 
 Mountain View Hospital (New Zealand)